Chris Henderson (born 1970) is an American soccer player.

Chris or Christopher Henderson  may also refer to:
Chris Henderson (American musician), guitarist with 3 Doors Down
Chris Henderson (Canadian musician) (born 1984), Canadian country musician
C. J. Henderson (writer) (1951–2014), American writer
C. J. Henderson (American football) (born 1998), American football cornerback
Christopher Henderson (character), a minor character in the television series 24
Christopher "Deep" Henderson, American music composer
George Henderson (Australian politician) (Christopher George Henderson, 1857–1933)